Loona (Lūṇā) is a Punjabi epic verse play written by Shiv Kumar Batalvi. Based on the ancient legend of Puran Bhagat, this epic was bestowed with prestigious Sahitya Akademi Award in 1967, given by Sahitya Akademi (India's National Academy of Letters). Shiv became the youngest recipient of this prestigious award.

Though Loona is portrayed as a villain in the legend, Shiv created the epic around her agony which caused her to become a villain.

Plot

The epic is based on the ancient legend of saint Puran Bhagat (Bhagat is the Punjabi word for a saint, devotee). Puran is a prince whose father marries a girl named Loona, who's much younger than his age. Loona, the stepmother of Puran, gets attracted to Puran and conveys her feelings to him. Puran, being a devotee of God and having pure thoughts, refuses. Loona gets hurt and seeks the revenge by convincing his husband to send Puran to exile. In the legend, Loona is the villain.

Shiv took a contrary view from the legend and created the epic around the pain of the teenaged girl forcefully married to a man much older than her age, and further, renounced by the man she fell in love with.

Importance in Punjabi Literature
This epic is considered a masterpiece in modern Punjabi literature, and which also created a new genre, of modern Punjabi kissa. Shiv's poetry is considered standing in equal footing, amongst that by stalwarts of modern Punjabi poetry, like Mohan Singh (poet) and Amrita Pritam, all of whom are popular on both sides of Indo-Pakistan border.

Awards
 Sahitya Akademi Award in 1967

References

Punjabi literature
Sahitya Akademi Award-winning works
Indian poems
Indian plays
20th-century Indian books
Indian mythology in popular culture
Hindu mythology in popular culture
Cultural depictions of Indian monarchs
Cultural depictions of Indian men
Punjabi-language books
1965 Indian novels
Novels about ephebophilia
Sexuality and age in fiction
Child marriage in India